HMS Elgin has been the name of two Royal Navy vessels:

 HMS Elgin, also known as Countess of Elgin, an armed ship in service 1811-1814
 , a  minesweeper launched in 1919

References

Royal Navy ship names